The 2004 Women's Junior European Volleyball Championship was the 19th edition of the competition, with the main phase (contested between 12 teams) held in Slovakia from 3 to 11 September 2004.

Qualification

Venues

Preliminary round

Pool I

|}

|}

Pool II

|}

|}

5th–8th classification

5th–8th semifinals

|}

7th place match

|}

5th place match

|}

Final round

Semifinals

|}

3rd place match

|}

Final

|}

Final standing

References

Women's Junior European Volleyball Championship
Europe
Volley
International volleyball competitions hosted by Slovakia